Salvaged artifacts from the  USS Arizona, a battleship that was catastrophically sunk during the 1941 attack on Pearl Harbor, are displayed in several locations around the United States.

The term "marine salvage" refers to the process of recovering a ship, its cargo, or other property after a shipwreck.  This is a list of those artifacts recovered from the shipwreck. These artifacts are on display in the Arizona State Capitol Museum, the Carl T. Hayden Veterans Administration Medical Center and in the Wesley Bolin Memorial Plaza, all of which are located in Phoenix. One of two salvaged bells of USS Arizona is on display in the University of Arizona Student Union Memorial Center in Tucson, and Glendale Veterans War Memorial in the city of Glendale, Arizona is constructed using material from the wreck of the battleship.

Also included in this list of salvaged artifacts is a piece of steel salvaged from USS Arizona on display at the USS South Dakota Memorial in Sioux Falls, South Dakota. Another piece of steel from Arizona is housed at the Veterans Memorial Museum in Laurel, Mississippi.

USS Arizona

List of salvaged artifacts

Arizona State Capitol Museum 
The first floor of the Arizona State Capitol Museum is home to a 500-pound superstructure piece of Arizona, the U.S. flag that flew on the ship when it sank, and pieces of the vessel's silver service.

Carl T. Hayden VA Medical Center 
A small piece of the ship's superstructure is on display in the second floor of the Carl T. Hayden VA (Veterans Administration) Hospital located at 650 E. Indian School Road in Phoenix. There is a plaque which reads:

Glendale Veterans Memorial 
The Glendale Veterans Memorial, also known as the Glendale USS Arizona Memorial, is located at 5959 West Brown Street in Glendale, Arizona. The City of Glendale acquired historical artifacts that were salvaged from Arizona in Pearl Harbor. The rusted metal pieces are from a portion of the potato locker in the ship's galley. The steel rings were cut from the USS Arizona Memorial flagpole.

University of Arizona Student Union Memorial Center 
The University of Arizona Student Union Memorial Center houses one of the original bells used in Arizona. The 1,820-pound bell is one of two salvaged from USS Arizona and is housed in the "bell tower". The bell is rung after every home football victory. The other bell is on display in the USS Arizona Memorial in Pearl Harbor. The University of Arizona Student Union Memorial Center is located at 1303 E University Blvd in Tucson. The bell is also rung by every Naval and USMC officer as they commission through The University of Arizona NROTC Unit.

Wesley Bolin Memorial Plaza 
Wesley Bolin Memorial Plaza is the home of the mast, anchor and the restored gun barrel of  Arizona.

The USS Arizona Signal Mast Committee purchased the upper  of signal mast of Arizona and transported it to Arizona and had it erected in Wesley Bolin Plaza. It was dedicated and donated to the state of Arizona on December 7, 1990. The  anchor was salvaged from Arizona after she was sunk by the Japanese in Pearl Harbor. It was previously on Arizona, but was in the relining process in the continental United States at the time of Pearl Harbor. The gun barrel served on  during World War II. It was officially placed on display at the plaza on December 7, 2013.

USS South Dakota Memorial 

A salvaged piece of steel from  USS Arizona is on display at the  Memorial in Sioux Falls, South Dakota.

References

External links 

 
 

1915 ships
Attack on Pearl Harbor
Ships built in Brooklyn
Ships present during the attack on Pearl Harbor
Ships sunk during the attack on Pearl Harbor
Shipwrecks of Hawaii
World War II shipwrecks in the Pacific Ocean
History of Arizona
World War II on the National Register of Historic Places in Hawaii